Humanity is a reggae album released by The Royal Rasses featuring Prince Lincoln Thompson in 1979.

The album was listed in the 1999 book The Rough Guide: Reggae: 100 Essential CDs.

Track listing
"San Salvador"
"They Know Not Jah"
"Old Time Friend"     
"Unconventional People"
"Love (The Way It Should Be)"
"Henry Kissinger"
"Kingston II"

Personnel
Prince Lincoln Thompson - vocals
Cedric Myton, Clinton Hall, Keith Peterkin - backing vocals
Bagga, Val Douglas - bass
Benbow, Leroy "Horsemouth" Wallace, Mikey Boo - drums
Lennox Gordon, Wayne McGee, Willie Lindo - guitar
Bobby Ellis, Herman Marquis, Tommy McCook, Vivian Hall - horns
Cecil Lloyd, Earl "Wire" Lindo, Geoffrey Chung, Paul Dixon - keyboards

Mixed by - Sylvan Morris at Harry J's
Recorded at Channel One Studios and Dynamic Sounds, Kingston, Jamaica

References

1979 albums
Lincoln Thompson albums